Amica Chips–Knauf was a UCI Professional Continental team based in San Marino that participated in UCI Continental Circuits. It formed in 2008 by signing riders most of that year.

The team folded partway through its first season, after the UCI suspended it due to not paying its riders.

Team roster
As of April 30, 2009.

References

Defunct cycling teams
Cycling teams established in 2009
Cycling teams disestablished in 2009
Cycling teams based in San Marino